Grutas de Lanquín is a large limestone cave system located  west of Lanquín in Alta Verapaz, Guatemala.

The Lanquín cave system was declared a national park in 1955.

References

External links

National parks of Guatemala
Caves of Guatemala
Limestone caves
Protected areas established in 1955
1955 establishments in Guatemala